Frank Mather was an English association football goalkeeper who played in the first two American National Challenge Cups. He played sporadically for Brooklyn Celtic.

Mather may have played for a team which competed in the 1909-1910 Derbyshire Cup. By 1913, he was playing for Brooklyn Celtic in the New York State Association Football League. In 1914, Celtic lost to the Brooklyn Wanderers in the first National Challenge Cup. He did not play again until January 1915 when he joined the New York Continentals. By May 1915, he was back with Celtic when they went to the final of the Challenge Cup, losing this time to Bethlehem Steel. He again took time off from the game, rejoining Celtic in February 1916.

References

Brooklyn Celtic players
English footballers
English expatriate footballers
Year of birth missing
Year of death missing
Association football goalkeepers
English expatriate sportspeople in the United States
Expatriate soccer players in the United States